The Casio PB-1000 is a handheld computer released by Casio in 1987.  It featured a touchscreen display which consisted of 16 keys built into the screen, arranged in fixed positions on a four by four matrix.

The computer itself included 8Kb of RAM and it was possible to install a 32Kb memory expansion card.

The PB-1000 was programmable in both a custom version of the BASIC language and an assembly language. A ROM card could be added for CASL assembly for the educational COMET simulator.

See also
Casio calculator character sets

External links
Casio PB-1000 J.Roa blog projects
Casio PB-1000 Home Page
PB-1000 emulator for Windows
Pocket Computing: PB-1000

Love-Love PB-1000 homepage
Obsolete Computer Museum: Casio PB-1000

Casio PB-1000 page at www.old-computers.com

PB-1000
Pocket computers
Products introduced in 1987